Stoneville is a census-designated place and unincorporated community located in northeastern Washington County, Mississippi.  Deer Creek flows through Stoneville.

A post office was established in 1876, and remains open.  Stoneville was incorporated in 1882, though it is no longer incorporated.

Stoneville was a stop on the Yazoo and Mississippi Valley Railroad, established in the 1880s, and a stop on the Columbus and Greenville Railway, established in the 1920s.

The Jamie Whitten Delta States Research Center is located in Stoneville.  George B. Vogt was a notable entomologist there.

It was first named as a CDP in the 2020 Census which listed a population of 39.

Demographics

2020 census

Note: the US Census treats Hispanic/Latino as an ethnic category. This table excludes Latinos from the racial categories and assigns them to a separate category. Hispanics/Latinos can be of any race.

Notable people
 Johnny "Big Moose" Walker, blues musician.

References

Unincorporated communities in Washington County, Mississippi
Unincorporated communities in Mississippi
Census-designated places in Washington County, Mississippi